is a junction passenger railway station  located in the city of   Amagasaki Hyōgo Prefecture, Japan. It is operated by the private transportation company Hanshin Electric Railway.

Lines
It is also served by the Hanshin Namba Line and is 0.9 kilometers from the terminus of that line at

Layout
The station consists of an elevated island platform sandwiched between two side platforms.Platform 1 has an effective length of 100 meters, and currently a 4-car train of Hanshin trains stops here. Tracks 2 to 4 are 130 meters long and can accommodate 6-car trains of both Hanshin's 19 m class trains and Kinki Nippon Railway's 21 m class trains. The ticket gates and concourse are on the 2nd floor, and the platforms are on the 3rd floor. There is only one ticket gate. The main line platform is slightly curved.

Platforms

Adjacent stations

All rapid express trains pass Chidoribashi, Dempo, Fuku, Dekijima, and Daimotsu every day from March 20, 2012, and suburban semi-express trains run to Amagasaki instead.

History 
Daimotsu Station was opened on April 12, 1905 with the opening of the Hanshin Main Line

Passenger statistics
In fiscal 2019, the station was used by an average of 8,571 passengers daily

Surrounding area
Japan National Route 2
 Daimotsu Park with a preserved JNR Class D51 steam locomotive
Amagasaki Daimotsu Hospital

See also
List of railway stations in Japan

References

External links

 Daimotsu Station website 

Railway stations in Japan opened in 1905
Railway stations in Hyōgo Prefecture
Hanshin Main Line
Amagasaki